Giambattista Almici (17 January 1717 – 14 July 1793) was an Italian jurist.

Biography
Giambattista Almici was born near Brescia, educated under the Jesuits, and at the University of Padua. He finally gave himself up to legal studies. After some official employments in which he gained great popularity, he traveled over Italy and Sicily. His marriage in 1771, and his family, seem have induced him to live in a more retired manner, and devote himself more to study. The third of his works is the book Organizations, law of nature, and nations, according to Catholic Principles, on the cover of this book is a quote, which has probably legal reference, it is said that "Nothing remarkable well suited to man, is to train to justice.", which was published in 1768. His fourth of his works is the book Remarks on the book of Mr. Elvezio entitled The Spirit of Giambatista Almici, that was published in 1766, a dedication to Angelo Contarini, Venetian procurator and reformer of the University of Padova. His brother Camillo Almici was an Italian priest and Oratorian.

References

Explanatory notes

Citations 

1717 births
1793 deaths
18th-century jurists
Italian jurists
18th-century Italian jurists
18th-century Italian writers
18th-century Italian male writers
University of Padua alumni